Kentucky Route 3145 (KY 3145) is a rural-secondary state highway located entirely in Warren County in South Central Kentucky. The route serves as a connector between U.S. Route 31W and Interstate 65 (I-65) on the far east side of Bowling Green.

Route description 
KY 3145 begins at exit 30 on I-65 and ends  with an intersection with US 31W in the eastern outskirts of Bowling Green.

History 
Plans for a northern outer loop in the Bowling Green area were proposed in the early 2000s in an attempt to create an alignment for a future I-66 corridor to run through the area via existing parkways. Those plans have long been cancelled due to protests in the Daniel Boone National Forest area to preserve karst formations in parts of Laurel and Pulaski counties.

In 2004, a year after the Kentucky Transpark was first opened, now-U.S. Senator Mitch McConnell was able to get federal funding for improvements to U.S. Route 31W in northeast Warren County, and for the connector road and new interchange. Phase one of the project was to build the four-lane connector road from I-65 to US 68, which was completed and opened to traffic, with a designation of Kentucky Route 3145, on July 6, 2017. Phase two was to extend the roadway, as a two-laner, to US 31W east of town to complete the project, which was completed on December 21, 2018. A total of $66.8 million was put into the interchange and new connector.

KY 3145 is the second connector road between US 31W and I-65 in Bowling Green; the first one was KY 446, at exit 28. The interchange at exit 30 was built to ease congestion from the other exits and the two U.S. Routes on the east side of Bowling Green. KY 3145 also serves commercial traffic to the interstate from the Kentucky Transpark, as well as the pre-existing Industrial Park near the Warren East High School.

Major intersections

References

3145
3145
Interstate 65